Chana Blanksztejn was a Polish-Jewish writer and journalist active in Vilna in the 1920s. Known for her fight for women's suffrage, she unsuccessfully ran in the 1922 Polish legislative election as a candidate of the Jewish Democratic People's Block of Folkspartei.

References
 

19th-century births
20th-century deaths
19th-century Polish Jews
20th-century Polish women writers
Polish suffragists
Polish feminists
Jewish feminists
Folkspartei politicians
Jewish suffragists
Jewish women writers